The following is a list of the islands in Hawaii. Despite being within the boundaries of Hawaii, Midway Atoll, comprising several smaller islands, is not included as an island of Hawaii, because it is classified as a United States Minor Outlying Islands and is therefore administered by the federal government and not the state.

Hawaii is divided into five counties: Hawaiʻi, Honolulu, Kalawao, Kauaʻi, and Maui. Each island is included in the boundaries and under the administration of one of these counties. Honolulu County, despite being centralized, administers the outlying Northwestern Hawaiian Islands. Kalawao (the smallest county in the United States in terms of land area) and Maui, both occupying the island of Molokaʻi, are the only counties that share the same island. Hawaii is typically recognized by its eight main islands: Hawaiʻi, Maui, Kahoʻolawe, Lānaʻi, Molokaʻi, Oʻahu, Kauaʻi, and Niʻihau.

The state of Hawaii officially recognizes only 137 islands in the state which includes four islands of the Midway Atoll. An island in this sense may also include much smaller and typically uninhabited islets, rocks, coral reefs, and atolls. For that reason, this article lists 152 separate islands (but also names smaller island chains such as the French Frigate Shoals, which includes 13 islands of its own). Some of these are too small to appear on maps, and others, such as Maro Reef, only appear above the water's surface during times of low tide. Others, such as Shark and Skate islands, have completely eroded away.

The majority of the Hawaiian Islands are uninhabited, with Niʻihau being the westernmost island with a population of around 130 natives, no one else is allowed on the island. All the islands west of Niʻihau—those categorized as the Northwestern Hawaiian Islands—are unpopulated and recently incorporated into the Papahānaumokuākea Marine National Monument. The island of Oʻahu has just over one million residents (about 70% of the state's population), and the island of Hawaiʻi is by far the largest island with an area of —62.7% of the state's land area. The islands were first settled as early as AD 300 by Polynesian long-distance navigators. British captain James Cook was the first European to land on the islands in January 1778. The islands, which were governed independently up until 1898 were then annexed by the United States as a territory from 1898 to 1959. On August 21, 1959, they were collectively admitted as the 50th state.

The islands are the exposed peaks of a great undersea mountain range known as the Hawaiian–Emperor seamount chain, formed by volcanic activity over a hotspot in the Earth's mantle. The islands in the northwest of the archipelago are older and typically smaller, due to longer exposure to erosion. The age of the archipelago has been estimated using potassium-argon dating methods. It is estimated that the northwesternmost Kure Atoll is the oldest at approximately 28 million years, while the southeasternmost Hawaiʻi Island is approximately 400,000 years old and still subjected to ongoing volcanism—one of the most active hotspots on Earth.

Hawaiʻi County

Hawaiʻi County centers on Hawaiʻi Island. It is also the largest island in the United States. In modern times, Hawaiʻi is known commonly as the "Big Island" to reduce confusion between the island and the state itself. Hawaiʻi County as a whole has 27 islands and a total population of 185,079.

Honolulu County

Known officially as the City and County of Honolulu, the county includes both the urban district of Honolulu (the state's largest city and capital) and the rest of the island of Oʻahu, as well as several minor surrounding islands. The county also administers the Northwestern Hawaiian Islands with the exception of the federal governed Midway Atoll. The county's population in 2010 was 953,207, making it the 43rd most populated county in the United States. At , the island of Oʻahu is the third largest island and also the most populated, accounting for approximately 70% of the entire state's population. The county as a whole has 63 islands, and 32 of those belong to the Northwestern Hawaiian Islands.

Northwestern Hawaii Islands

The Northwestern Hawaiian Islands (also known as the Leeward Islands) are the small islands and atolls in the Hawaiian island chain located northwest of the larger islands of Kauaʻi and Niʻihau. For administrative purposes, all of these islands are controlled by Honolulu County. The Northwestern Hawaiian Islands consist of nine main islands and innumerable islets, coral reefs, atolls, sandbar, and intermittent islands—some of which are officially named. All of these islands account for only  and have no permanent residents.

Midway Atoll, sometimes referred to as Midway Island, is a  archipelago. For quite some time, it had a permanent population of naval personnel. Kure Atoll is the only island west at  beyond Midway Atoll. It also observes a different time zone (Samoa Time Zone) than the rest of the Hawaiian Islands. Because of its strong military history, Midway Atoll is classified as a Minor Outlying Island, an unorganized territory of the United States and is therefore not under the jurisdiction of Hawaii. Midway Atoll consists of four individual islands.

Kalawao County

Kalawao County contains no individual islands of its own. With a census population of 90, the county is the country's smallest county in terms of population with 44 fewer residents than Loving County, Texas. At , it is the smallest county by land area in the United States and is often omitted from maps. Kalawao County shares the island of Molokaʻi with Maui County and occupies only 5% of the island's  and 1.2% of the island's 7,404 residents.

Kauaʻi County

Kauaʻi County is the northwesternmost county (excluding the Northwestern Hawaiian Islands) in the state. It occupies the two main islands of Kauaʻi and Niʻihau. With a population of 58,303 (2000), it holds 99.7% of the county's population of 58,463. The remaining 160 residents reside on Niʻihau. Lehua and Kaʻula are the third and fourth largest islands, although they are very small and uninhabited. Kaʻula is the westernmost of the Hawaiian Islands not included in the Northwestern Hawaiian Island chain. The county as a whole has eight islands.

Maui County

Maui County consists of four of the state's main islands: Maui, Kahoʻolawe, Lānaʻi, and Molokaʻi. The island of Maui has the most residents at 117,644 (76% of the county's population). At , Kahoʻolawe is the state's largest island with no permanent inhabitants. Lānaʻi has a population of 3,193; Molokaʻi has a population of 7,404. Molokaʻi is the only island in Hawaii that is divided between two counties. With a population of 90, Kalawao County occupies a tiny  portion on the northern shore of the island. Maui County contains 59 named islands.

References

External links
Hawaii Place Names

Islands

Hawaii